The Australasian Computer Music Association (ACMA) is a nonprofit Australia and New Zealand based organisation founded in 1989, which aims to promote electroacoustic and computer music.

History
ACMA was formed in 1989 as a regional organisation to promote electronic and computer music. The majority of ACMA's membership live in Australia and New Zealand. Although there are no formal ties with other associations, ACMA maintains close ties with internationally based sister organisations, such as the Canadian Electroacoustic Community (CEC), the Sonic Arts Network in the U.K., Society for Electro-Acoustic Music in the United States (SEAMUS) in the North America, and the International Computer Music Association.

In 1989 ACMA was first presided by Graeme Gerrard (President), with Jim Sosnin (Vice-President), David Hirst (Secretary), and Ann Shirley-Peel (Treasurer).

Conferences
Each year ACMA hosts the Australasian Computer Music Conference (ACMC) in alternating cities of Australia and New Zealand.

References

External links
ACMA — Australasian Computer Music Association
ACMC — Australasian Computer Music Conference
ACMC announcement (2012). Griffith University, Queensland Conservatorium. Retrieved August 6, 2016.

Computer music
Music organisations based in New Zealand
Organizations established in 1989
Music organisations based in Australia